Norman Frederick Charles Hobbs (17 October 1900 – 6 April 1966) was an English cricketer. Hobbs' batting style is unknown. He was born at Cheltenham, Gloucestershire.

Hobbs made his first-class debut for Gloucestershire against Sussex at Greenbank, Bristol, in the 1924 County Championship. He made five further first-class appearances for the county in 1924, the last of which came against Leicestershire at Aylestone Road, Leicester. In his six first-class matches, he scored 53 runs at an average of 5.88, with a high score of 28.

He died at Weston, Somerset, on 6 April 1966.

References

External links
Norman Hobbs at ESPNcricinfo
Norman Hobbs at CricketArchive

1900 births
1966 deaths
Sportspeople from Cheltenham
English cricketers
Gloucestershire cricketers